Joseph Jerry Andrew (born March 1, 1960) is an American politician and lawyer. He was national chairman of the Democratic National Committee (DNC) from 1999 to 2001. He previously served as chairman of the Indiana Democratic Party from 1995 to 1999. He served with DNC General Chairman Ed Rendell. Asked to serve by President Bill Clinton, Andrew became, at the age of 39, one of the youngest chairpersons in the history of the DNC. He later served as chairman of the New Democratic Network, and in 2006 helped to found The Blue Fund, a mutual fund which invests in companies that contribute to Democratic campaigns. He now serves as the global chairman of Dentons, the world's largest law firm.

Andrew was considered to be a candidate for Governor of Indiana in 2004, but he decided against it after Joe Kernan announced that he would run.  During the 2008 Democratic presidential nominating contest he was one of the first to endorse Senator Hillary Clinton in November 2007. However, on May 1, 2008, he switched his endorsement to Senator Barack Obama.

Andrew, a native of  Fort Wayne, Indiana, graduated from Yale University in 1982 and Yale Law School in 1985. While at Yale, he served as editor-in-chief of the Yale University literary review. Shortly after law school, he began his career in politics working on Democratic campaigns. He worked as the campaign manager for attorney Jack Wickes during the 1988 United States Senate election in Indiana. He also served as campaign advisor to Secretary of State of Indiana Joseph H. Hogsett, whose term was from 1989-1994.

See also
Majority Action, a 2005 issue-advocacy organization

References

External links
 Democratic National Committee
 

|-

1960 births
Democratic National Committee chairs
Indiana Democrats
Indiana lawyers
Living people
Politicians from Indianapolis
State political party chairs of Indiana
Yale Law School alumni
People from Fort Wayne, Indiana